Castelo Forte FC is a portuguese football club from Oeiras, Portugal. It was founded on September 10, 2005 and currently plays in the AF Lisboa 2° Divisão, the sixth tier of Portuguese football. They share their home stadium Dr. Simões Alves with U.D.R. Algés, the local team from the parish of Algés (Oeiras).

During 2016–17 season, the club roped in four Indian players, Deep Moorjani, Gautam Medikonda, Andrew Kyle Silva, and Vansh Shrisvastava in their squad.

Current squad

See also
 List of football clubs in Portugal

References

External links
 (archived 12 January 2018)
Castelo Forte FC at ceroacero.es

Association football clubs established in 2005
Football clubs in Portugal